Albert Miller may refer to:

Bert Miller (footballer) (Albert Bertrand W. Miller, 1880–1953), English footballer
Allie Miller (Albert Crist Miller, 1886–?), American football player and coach
Alan Mills (musician) (1912–1977), born Albert Miller, Canadian singer
Albert Roger Miller, known as Roger Milla (born 1952), Cameroonian footballer
Albert Miller (athlete) (born 1957), Fijian decathlete and hurdler
Albert C. Miller (1898–1979), American attorney

See also
Al Miller (disambiguation), several people
Bert Miller (disambiguation), several people
Albert Miller Lea (1808–1891), American engineer, soldier and topographer